This is a list of flag bearers who have represented Great Britain at the Olympics.  Flag bearers carried the national flag of their country at the Parade of Nations of the Summer and Winter Olympic Games.  Men and women from across the country and from a variety of sports have been chosen to bear their national flag at the opening ceremony.  Two people have been given the honour on more than one occasion.

Firsts

First flag bearer

The 1906 Intercalated Games is no longer considered by the International Olympic Committee (IOC) to be part of the Summer Olympic Games but it was the first such event to feature an opening ceremony with a parade of nations. William Grenfell, 1st Baron Desborough, a member of the British fencing team who went on to be president of the British Olympic Council in time for the 1908 Games in London, was the first person to carry the flag for Great Britain.

With the 1908 London Games being the first true Summer Olympics to feature a parade of nations, cricketer Kynaston Studd can be said to be the first person to carry the flag for Britain at an Olympic event.  However, cricket was only played at the 1900 Olympic Games (see: Cricket at the 1900 Summer Olympics) and Studd was therefore not a competitor. Charles Sydney Smith won a 1908 gold medal in water polo and was chosen to represent the country as the flag bearer at the 1912 Summer Olympics in Stockholm, Sweden.  This made him the first competing athlete to carry the flag for Great Britain.

First female flag bearer
The first woman to carry the flag was Mollie Phillips, a figure skater, who led the ceremony at the 1932 Winter Olympics in Lake Placid, New York. This made her the first woman to lead out her national team at any Olympic Games. The 1932 British Winter Olympic team comprised only four athletes, all in figure skating and all female. Phillips was by far the senior member of the team at the age of 24 compared to Joan Dix, the second oldest, at just 13 years of age.

The first female flag bearer at a Summer Olympic event was Anita Lonsbrough at the 1960 Games in Rome.  Her gold medals at the 1958 British Empire and Commonwealth Games and successes in the LEN European Aquatics Championships no doubt aided her selection.

Nations
The Great British team includes athletes from England, Wales, Scotland, and Northern Ireland.  Frederick McEvoy was the first person born outside England to bear the British flag.  Furthermore, as he was born in Australia, he was the first person born outside of the United Kingdom to represent the country. The first person born in Scotland to lead the team out in the ceremony was gold medal-winning boxer Richard McTaggart in 1960. Lynn Davies became the first person from Wales to carry the British flag in 1968. To date nobody from Northern Ireland has been given the honour.

Repeated flag bearing
While most flag bearers have only represented Great Britain once, rowing gold-medallist Steve Redgrave was chosen for the honour in two consecutive Summer Olympic Games (1992 and 1996) and biathlete Mike Dixon carried the flag in three consecutive Winter Olympic Games (1994, 1998, and 2002). Redgrave decided not to stand for candidature during the selection process of the 2000 Summer Games.

Selection and reactions

The flag bearers are chosen by the British Olympic Association who sometimes open up the process to other British sporting agencies.  The current process involves asking each sport involved in Team GB to nominate one of their own competitors, then to vote on the shortlist.  This means that the process is open to a wider group of people and can involve the competitors themselves.  The chosen flag bearer receives a certificate to commemorate their selection.

The athletes see their selection as an honour to lead the other British competitors out at the ceremony:

As the parade became more firmly entrenched in tradition the pride in the role has grown.  Flag bearers look back at those who previously filled the role and feel honoured to be chosen amongst them:

The selection of a competitor can be seen as a positive reflection on the sport that they represent.  When Kate Howey was chosen to bear the flag the British Judo Association noted that they were "thrilled that Kate and Judo have been given this tremendous honour".

Boycotts
The 1980 Summer Olympics boycott, initiated by the United States to protest against the Soviet–Afghan War, saw many countries pull out of the Games and only 16 nations appeared at the opening ceremony. Dick Palmer, secretary to the British Olympic Association, carried the Olympic flag and marched by himself.  The Soviet cameramen avoided the protesting marchers and few Soviet commentators mentioned it. Only one comment was recorded: "There is the clumsy plot that you all can see, against the traditions of the Olympic movement."

While the flag bearer usually leads a large number of competitors from their country it is becoming increasingly common for athletes to stay away from the opening ceremony.  The lengthy procession is said to be tiring and a distraction from important preparations.  This is particularly relevant to those competing in the days immediately after the ceremony. UK Athletics, presided by 1968 flag bearer Lynn Davies, announced that none of its competitors will take part in the 2012 Summer Olympics opening ceremony in London. Head coach Charles van Commenee explained "They would not go shopping for eight hours before their biggest event so why would you be on your feet for that long?"

Other sports leaders have done the same. 2008 flag bearer Mark Foster was the only swimmer to take part in the parade while none of his colleagues were permitted to join in the celebration. They also avoided the 2012 event, preceded the year before by a statement setting the expectation:

If competitors from the other early sports (rowing, cycling, basketball, volleyball, handball, badminton, and gymnastics) also shun the parade the British representation may look very small at their own Olympics. Paul Deighton, chief executive of the London 2012 Organising Committee, moved to reassure athletes and coaches, explaining that all competitors will have completed their duties before midnight and will have sufficient time to rest. The final decision will lie with the individuals and their coaching team.

Other notes
Skeleton athlete Shelley Rudman represented Great Britain at the 2010 Winter Olympics as the only medal winner from the previous Winter Olympics.
Six flag bearers were competitors in the Bobsleigh, the most from any individual sport.
In the Summer Games, competitors from athletic events have led their country out to parade more than any sportspeople.

List of flag bearers
List of flag bearers:

See also
Great Britain at the Olympics

References

Great Britain at the Olympics
Great Britain
flag bearers